Declan Fogerty (born 10 September 1960 in Banagher, County Offaly) is an Irish former sportsperson. He played hurling with his local club St Rynagh's and was a member of the Offaly senior inter-county team from 1983 until 1988.

References

1960 births
Living people
St Rynagh's hurlers
Offaly inter-county hurlers
All-Ireland Senior Hurling Championship winners
Irish schoolteachers